Peter Hackett may refer to:

Peter Hackett (frontiersman) (ca. 1763–1828), American frontiersman
Peter Hackett (racing driver), Australian motorsport racer
Peter Hackett (mountaineer), American mountaineer and physician